The Delta pikeblenny (Chaenopsis deltarrhis) is a species of chaenopsid blenny found from Costa Rica to Colombia, in the eastern central Pacific ocean. It can reach a maximum length of  TL. This species feeds primarily on zooplankton.

References
 Böhlke, J. E. 1957 (26 July) A review of the blenny genus Chaenopsis, and the description of a related new genus from the Bahamas. Proceedings of the Academy of Natural Sciences of Philadelphia v. 109: 81-103, Pls. 5–6.

deltarrhis
Western Central American coastal fauna
Fish of Costa Rica
Fish of Panama
Fish of Colombia
Fish described in 1957
Taxa named by James Erwin Böhlke